Lodi High School, serving grades 9–12, is one of four comprehensive high schools in Lodi Unified School District. The physical plant encompasses three gymnasiums, 59 permanent classrooms, one cafeteria, 30 portables, four computer labs, one theater complex, a college and career center, one administration center, one counseling center, and one metal, one wood and one automotive technology shop.  While the present site was built in 1956, Lodi High School began classes on September 8, 1896, and celebrated its centennial birthday during the 1996–97 school year. At the present time, Lodi High School is on a modified traditional calendar.

History
The school first opened on September 8, 1896.

One Chip Challenge 
Lodi High School says three students landed in the emergency room after participating in the "One Chip Challenge" that has been trending online.

According to the Lodi Unified School District, in addition to the hospitalized students, a number of Lodi High students were sent home as a result of their participation in the challenge. All the students have since returned to school.

Notable alumni
Patty Berg-Burnett - volleyball player and coach
Greg Bishop - 6-year NFL offensive lineman
Alyson Huber - Assemblywoman, Judge
Patrick Ianni - soccer defender for the Seattle Sounders
Tayt Ianni - former soccer defender for the San Jose Earthquakes
Carl Kammerer - NFL player in 1960s
Bridget Marquardt - Reality television participant and model
Robert Mondavi - Mondavi Wines
Bill Munson - 16-year NFL quarterback
Patrick Purdy - Cleveland Elementary School shooter
A Skylit Drive - A 6 piece Post-hardcore band. 
Kris Tetz - [Minor League Baseball Player] Early 2000’s

References

High schools in San Joaquin County, California
Education in Stockton, California
Public high schools in California
High School
1896 establishments in California